Sergei Andreevich Losev (1927 – 3 October 1988) was a Soviet journalist and politician. From 1979 to 1988 he was general director of TASS, the Soviet Union’s official news agency.

Life
After graduation from the Moscow Institute of International Relations, Losev joined TASS in 1950. He was a correspondent and bureau chief in the United States and Israel. In 1973 he became assistant director of TASS,and in 1979 became the agency's director.

Losev was a member of the Communist Party's Central Auditing Commission, a delegate to the 1981 and 1986 Communist Party congresses, and a delegate to the 1988 Communist Party conference. He had also been a member of the Supreme Soviet of the Soviet Union.

He died in Moscow on 3 October 1988.

References

1927 births
1988 deaths
Soviet journalists
Soviet politicians